Niš Constantine the Great Airport , located  northwest of downtown Niš, in the suburbs of Medoševac and Popovac. It is the second-largest and second-busiest airport in Serbia, after Belgrade Nikola Tesla Airport. Niš Military Air Base (Serbian Air Force and Air Defence), the Serbian-Russian Emergency Response Centre and Centre for Aerial Firefighting Duties are all located on the site of the airport.

History

Early years 
The first airfield serving the city of Niš was established in 1910, near the village of Donje Međurovo. In the 1930s, then-national airline company Aeroput used the airport for civil service. In 1935, Aeroput included a stop in Niš in its, back then domestic, route linking Belgrade with Skopje.

Following World War II, the airport was used as a military base. Among other units, it was a base for the 63rd Paratroop Brigade and 119th Aviation Brigade. A portion of the airport is still used by the Serbian Air Force and Air Defence.

In the 1970s, the airport was used for occasional service to the Adriatic coast. By the 1980s, this occasional service led the local authorities to recognize the needs of the people living in Niš as well as Southern and Eastern Serbia and took into account the economic development of the city. The association of economic and political entities prepared detailed terms and in 1986 made a decision on establishing the entity "Airport Niš".

The terminal building as well as the ancillary support facilities were built and opened to service in 1986. This project also included the asphalt coated runway and built-in system of lights that provided visual descent guidance during runway approaches at night. The development of air traffic in Niš was not initiated just by JAT Yugoslav Airlines, but also by Slovenian company Inex-Adria Airways (Adria Airways nowadays), although both were domestic airlines back then.

The Breakup of Yugoslavia at the beginning of 1990s brought to the sharp decrease in travelling to the Adriatic Sea, Ljubljana and Zagreb, once the busiest routes from Niš. This was followed by United Nations sanctions imposed on Serbia and Montenegro which included a ban on international air travel. In these circumstances the volume of traffic reached its lowest point with the only route being to Tivat Airport during the summer period. In 1998, the traffic volume increased owing to the heavy air traffic from Pristina International Airport which was out of use because of numerous foggy days during which the traffic was successfully carried out from Niš. The airport was heavily damaged during the 1999 NATO bombing of Yugoslavia.

The airport was reopened in 2003 with the financial assistance from government of Norway. Damage sustained during the bombing was repaired, including the building of a new control tower and renewal of the terminal building.

In 2004, Jat Airways and Montenegro Airlines resumed flights from Niš to Zurich, Paris, and Tivat. In 2010, Wind Jet connected the airport with Forlì, Italy while Montenegro Airlines linked it with Podgorica on a daily basis. The route to Podgorica was discontinued in 2013 because of low passenger numbers. For more than two years (2014-2015) there were only charter flights to and from Niš.

Recent developments

The expansion in traffic began in 2015 when low-cost airline Wizz Air launched flights to Basel and Malmö. Shortly after, Ryanair followed the suit by announcing flights to Berlin. In 2016, both Wizzair and Ryanair announced more flights from Niš, respectively Wizzair to Dortmund, Eindhoven, Memmingen and Ryanair to Weeze, Bergamo and Bratislava. 
Shortly after the launch of these flights Niš experienced triple-digit growth in passenger traffic, exceeding the previous record figure. In October 2016, Turkish Cargo, the airline for the transport of cargo which is a part of Turkish Airlines commenced scheduled cargo service between Niš and Istanbul. In November 2016, Swiss International Air Lines announced flights to Zurich, operated by the Airbus 320. In December 2016, Swiss got direct competition when Germania Flug announced flights to Zurich, starting June 2017 operated by the Airbus 319.

In December 2016, it was announced that Constantine the Great Airport airport began overhaul of its terminal by expanding check-in and boarding space, as well as building a new exterior and fixing the roof. The project is being funded jointly by the Government of Serbia and local authorities. Furthermore, the Serbia and Montenegro Air Traffic Services Agency (SMATSA) plans to start construction of a new control tower next year and will invest a million euros in an instrument landing system (ILS), which provides guidance to aircraft approaching and landing on a runway during low ceilings or reduced visibility due to fog, rain or snow.

In January 2018, the Government of Serbia granted a 25-year concession of the Serbian largest Belgrade Nikola Tesla Airport to the French airport operator Vinci Airports for a sum of 501 million euros. As part of the deal, other three Serbian civil airports (Niš Constantine the Great Airport, Ponikve Airport and Morava Airport) are restricted when it comes to annual passenger flow expansion; they are allowed to increase to a maximum of 1 million passengers over the next 12 years.

Plans exist for Niš Constantine the Great Airport to be linked to twelve more European cities, after Government of Serbia publish document about lines of public interests (PSO). Companies with the best offers will be granted 5 million euros. Twelve destinations of public interest are Frankfurt, Rome, Hannover, Ljubljana, Bologna, Budapest, Göteborg, Friedrichshafen, Karlsruhe, Salzburg, Nuremberg, Tivat. Currently, the airport serves the total of fourteen regular non stop destinations in eight countries during the whole year, plus four seasonal and tree seasonal charter flights during peek summer months.

As of 2022, progress has been made in construction of the new Airport terminal. The new terminal will span over an area of 7.160 square meters and will feature ten check-in desks, self-check-in stations, eight passport control booths, four passenger gates, one VIP gate, one air bridge and a luggage sorting facility. The new terminal is set to be completed in 2024 and the expansion will enable the Airport to handle up to 1.5 million passenger annually.

Airlines and destinations 
The following airlines operate regular scheduled, seasonal and charter flights from Niš Constantine the Great Airport:

Statistics

Niš Military Air Base
The Sergeant-pilot Mihajlo Petrović Air Base, commonly known as Niš Air Base is located at the airport. Operated by the Serbian Air Force and Air Defence, base is home to the 119th Mixed Helicopter Squadron "Dragons" of the 98th Air Brigade. It is also home to the elite 63rd Parachute Brigade, special forces unit.

Emergency Response Centre

 

In 2009, the Serbian Ministry of Internal Affairs and the Russian Ministry of Emergency Situations established a joint Serbian-Russian Emergency Response Centre at the Niš Constantine the Great Airport, also known as Russian-Serbian Humanitarian Center. In 2011, a Russian Mil Mi-26 and Beriev Be-200 were dispatched to this centre for aerial firefighting duties in the region. The centre was put into operation in 2012.

Transport links

Public Transport
There are two bus lines operated by city public bus company (PE Directorate for Public Urban Transport Niš) that connects airport to the city center and most of the Niš suburbs - line 34A (Airport-Central Bus Station-Central Railway station-Airport) and 34B (Airport-Central Railway station-Central Bus Station-Airport). One single ticket costs around 80 dinars (0,68 euro) and can be purchased directly in the bus. Buses are running every 20 to 30 minutes.On the following website you can check all the public transport lines operated by PE Directorate for Public Urban Transport Niš: https://www.jgpnis.rs/red-voznje/

Taxi Service
Approximately 50 meters on the left side when exit passenger terminal is a parking lot and a taxi stand. If you are planning on traveling by taxi, all of the registered taxi companies charge around 80 dinars start prize (0.68 euros) plus the prize to the destination. Depending on your destination, the ride may cost anywhere from 250 dinars (2.13 euros) to the city center in Niš and up to 800 dinars (6.82 euros) to Niška Banja.The most popular registered taxi companies are: Prvi Taxi Niš (https://prvi.taxi), Eko Taxi (https://ekotaxi.rs) and BROS TAXI NIŠ (https://www.brostaxi.rs).

Rent a Car

There are nine rent a car agencies available at the airport. Those are: Avis (www.avis.com), Budget (www.budget.rs), Europcar (www.europcar.rs), Hertz (www.hertz.rs), Greenmotion (www.rentacarnis.rs), Inex Lux (www.nisrentacar.rs), Yu tim (www.yutim.rs), Sixt (www.sixt.rs), AR Rent-a-car (www.arrentacar.rs).

Parking at the Airport

Niš Constantin the Great Airport has parking in front of the terminal building that works 24 hours every day. First 15 minutes are free of charge, and after you have to pay. The prices can be found here: https://nipark.rs/cenovnik/ and it is possible to pay with cash or bank cards.

See also
 List of airports in Serbia
 Airports of Serbia
 Transport in Serbia
 AirSerbia

References

External links

 

1990 establishments in Serbia
Airports in Serbia
Transport in Niš
Serbian Air Force and Air Defence bases